Auburn Public Library may refer to:

Auburn Public Library (California)
Auburn Public Library (Maine)
Auburn Public Library (Washington)